Matthew T. "Matt" Dean (born April 15, 1966) is an American politician. He served as the Majority Leader of the Minnesota House of Representatives from 2011 to 2013. A member of the Republican Party of Minnesota, he represented District 38B, which included portions of Ramsey and Washington counties in the eastern Twin Cities metropolitan area. He is an architect and the owner of Dean Architects in Dellwood.

Early life and education
Born in the northeastern Minnesota city of Ely, Dean was raised in the Twin Cities suburb of Roseville. He graduated from the University of Minnesota in Minneapolis with a Bachelor of Architecture degree. Dean competed in track and cross country in high school and college.

Minnesota House of Representatives
Dean was first elected in 2004, and was reelected in 2006, 2008, 2010, and 2012. He served as the Majority Leader of the Minnesota House of Representatives from 2011 to 2013, having been selected by his caucus for the position on November 6, 2010.

Electoral history

2016 MN State House Seat 38B
Matt Dean (R, Incumbent) 56.94%
Ami Wazlawik (DFL) 42.95%
2014 MN State House Seat 38B
Matt Dean (R, Incumbent) 56.07%
Greg Pariseau (DFL) 43.80%
2012 MN State House Seat 38B
Matt Dean (R, Incumbent) 52.30%
Greg Pariseau (DFL) 47.54%
2010 MN State House Seat 52B
Matt Dean (R, Incumbent) 60.51%
Sten Hakanson (DFL) 39.46%
2008 MN State House Seat 52B
Matt Dean (R, Incumbent) 55.6%
Kate Christopher (DFL) 44.3%
2006 MN State House Seat 52B
Matt Dean (R, incumbent), 51.85%
Jason Gonnion (DFL), 48.11%
2004 MN State House Seat 52B
Matt Dean (R), 51.59%
Rebecca Otto (DFL, incumbent), 48.32%
2003 MN State House Seat 52B (Special Election)
Rebecca Otto (DFL), 54.30%
Matt Dean (GOP), 43.47%

Interaction with Neil Gaiman

In May 2011, author Neil Gaiman was invited to speak at the Stillwater Library in Minnesota. Gaiman has a fixed policy of charging very high speaking fees for his appearances, believing that such fees will discourage most people from requesting he speak, leaving him more time for writing. Gaiman's fee was taken from a special fund established to bring authors in to speak at local libraries. Dean took issue with the expenditure, saying that Gaiman was an author he hated, and describing him as a "pencil-necked little weasel who stole $45,000 from the state of Minnesota." The actual fee was $40,000. Gaiman pointed out that he had donated his speaking fee to charity long before Dean's comments.

After some press coverage, at his mother's urging, Dean apologized for being a "name caller".

References

External links

 Project Votesmart: Rep. Dean Profile
 Matt Dean on Twitter
 Matt Dean on Facebook

|-

1966 births
Living people
Republican Party members of the Minnesota House of Representatives
People from Roseville, Minnesota
People from Ely, Minnesota
University of Minnesota School of Architecture alumni
21st-century American politicians